The Association of National Olympic Committees of Africa (acronym: ANOCA; , ACNOA) is an international organization that unites the 54 National Olympic Committees (NOCs) of Africa. It is currently headquartered in Abuja, Nigeria. It serves as the successor to Standing Committee of African Sports or Comité permanent du sport africain founded in 1965 in Brazzaville, Republic of Congo.

It often assembles with other continental NOCs in the form of the Association of National Olympic Committees (ANOC).

History 
The Association of National Olympic Committees of Africa (ANOCA) was founded on June 28, 1981, in Lome, Togo. In July 1965, ANOCA's predecessor, the Standing Committee of African Sports (SCAS) was founded in Brazzaville as  Comité Permanent du Sport Africain (CPSA). Consequently, that title for the sports continental body changed to the Supreme Council for Sports in Africa (SCSA) on 14 December 1966 in Bamako, Mali.

On 4 March 2023, ANOCA announced their support for the International Olympic Committee's decision to reinstate Russian and Belarusian athletes as neutrals amidst the Russo-Ukrainian War, as well as the countries' participation in the Olympics.

Member countries 
In the following table, the year in which the NOC was recognized by the International Olympic Committee (IOC) is also given if it is different from the year in which the NOC was created.

ANOCA Regional Zones

ANOCA Zone 1 – North Zone

ANOCA Zone 2 – West Zone A

ANOCA Zone 3 – West Zone B

ANOCA Zone 4 – Central Zone

ANOCA Zone 5 – Central-East Zone

ANOCA Zone 6 – Southern Zone A

ANOCA Zone 7 – Southern Zone B

ANOCA Presidents

ANOCA's programme 
 Encouraging mediation and conciliation between NOCs and governments
 Building the foundations of an ambitious sports policy
 Providing young athletes with the conditions for success
 Promoting sports initiatives
 Promoting Olympic ideals and values in Africa
 Taking part in the fight against doping, corruption, violence and pandemics
 Working to bring peoples together through sport to build a peaceful Africa

Events
 African Games
 African Youth Games – first held in Rabat, Morocco in 2010 (events also in Casablanca).
 African Beach Games
 ANOCA U-23 Championship/Olympic Qualifying Tournament
 ANOCA Women's Olympic Qualifying Tournament

See also
Sport in Africa
African Sports Confederation of Disabled

References

External links
 Official website
 African Sports Confederation of Disabled (ASCOD) Official website

Africa
Olympic organizations
Olympic Committee
1981 establishments in Africa
Sports organizations established in 1981